The South Fork Catawba River (better known as the South Fork River) begins south of Hickory, North Carolina just northwest of the intersection of US Highway 321 and North Carolina Highway 10, at the confluence of the Henry Fork and Jacob Fork.  The South Fork Catawba River travels 48.5 miles, passing along the communities of Lincolnton, High Shoals, McAdenville, and Cramerton, to Lake Wylie where its now submerged confluence with the Catawba River lies near the North Carolina and South Carolina border.

Signage on roadways crossing the river acknowledge it as the "South Fork River".

The river is part of the Santee River Watershed.

Variant names
According to the Geographic Names Information System, it has also been known historically as:  
Little Catawba River
South Fork
South Fork River
South Fork of the Catawbaw River

See also
List of North Carolina rivers

References

Tributaries of the Catawba River
Rivers of Catawba County, North Carolina
Rivers of Gaston County, North Carolina
Rivers of Lincoln County, North Carolina
Rivers of North Carolina